Two Degrees of Ecuador (Spanish: A dos grados del ecuador) is a 1953 Spanish  adventure film directed by Ángel Vilches and starring José María Seoane, Rosita Yarza and Ángel Picazo.

Cast
 José María Seoane as Rafael Mendoza  
 Rosita Yarza as Mariena 
 Ángel Picazo as Fernando Martin 
 Alfonso Candel as Louis Herval  
 Miguel Pastor as Padre Alfonso  
 Carlos Díaz de Mendoza as Fabián  
 Manuel Dicenta as Captain MacHill  
 Domingo del Moral as Ramirez  
 Antonio García Quijada as Subgobernador  
 Aníbal Vela hijo as Periodista  
 Luis Llaneza as Rector  
 Fernando Sala as Delegedo de kogo  
 José Manuel Martín

References

Bibliography 
 Juan Francisco Cerón Gómez. Cien años de cine en Lorca. EDITUM, 1999.

External links 
 

1953 adventure films
Spanish adventure films
1953 films
1950s Spanish-language films
Spanish black-and-white films
1950s Spanish films